Adam Sýkora (born 7 September 2004) is a Slovak professional ice hockey forward for HK Nitra of the Slovak Extraliga while under with the New York Rangers of the National Hockey League (NHL). He was drafted by the New York Rangers in the second round, 63rd overall, of the 2022 NHL Entry Draft.

Playing career
Sýkora was drafted by the New York Rangers with the 63rd overall pick of the 2022 NHL Entry Draft. He signed a three-year, entry-level contract with the Rangers on 15 July 2022. He joined the Rangers for the beginning of their 2022 training camp but was returned to HK Nitra after playing one preseason game.

International play

Sýkora represented the Slovak national under-18 team on their runner-up team in the 2021 Hlinka Gretzky Cup, scoring two goals in five tournament games, including one in the semifinals game against Finnish national under-18 team.

He played for the Slovak national team in the 2022 IIHF World Championship, in which Slovakia finished in eighth place. Sýkora scored two goals and had one assist in six games during the tournament.

Player profile
Sýkora's strengths as an ice hockey player are speed, defense and competitiveness, but his size likely hurt his NHL draft position. The Hockey News writer Steven Ellis wrote in advance of the 2022 World Championships that Sýkora "is an active forechecker who doesn't let his 5-foot-10 frame hold him back against the older and more physically mature competition in the Slovak men's league" and that "his playstyle and motor in combination with his skill and knack for finding a way to score give him the ability to play up and down the lineup."  The Hockey News writer Tony Ferrari praised Sýkora's speed and creativity on offense and his backchecking ability and commitment on defense.  Rangers' director of player development Jed Ortmeyer said of him after he participated in the Rangers' 2022 prospect camp "How can you not like him? He's got a smile on his face all the time. Just positive, he wants to work, he's excited to be here. Great energy in the room. It was fun to work with and get to know him this week."

Sýkora said that he models his game after Brad Marchand of the Boston Bruins. Sýkora said that "I really like Brad Marchand from the Boston Bruins. He's like a rat and he isn't scared of (taller) players."

Career statistics

Regular season and playoffs

International

References

External links
 

2004 births
Living people
HK Levice players
HK Nitra players
New York Rangers draft picks
Sportspeople from Piešťany
Slovak ice hockey forwards